The Asian Football Confederation is the governing body of association football, beach football, and futsal in some countries/territories in Asia and Oceania. It has 47 member countries most of which are located in Asia. Australia, formerly in OFC, joined AFC in 2006. Guam and the Northern Mariana Islands, both territories of the United States, are also AFC members that are geographically in Oceania. The Asian Ladies Football Confederation (ALFC) was the section of AFC who managed women's association football in Asia. The group was independently founded in April 1968 in a meeting involving Taiwan, Hong Kong, Malaysia and Singapore. In 1986 ALFC merged with AFC.

Executive Committee

Notes

Sponsors

Member associations

It has 47 member associations split into 5 regions. Some nations proposed a South West Asian Federation that would not interfere with AFC zones. Afghanistan, Burma (Myanmar), Republic of China, Hong Kong,  India, Indonesia, Japan, South Korea, Pakistan, Philippines, Singapore and Vietnam were founding members.

Notes

Former members

Tournaments

National teams 
Men's
AFC Asian Cup
AFC Solidarity Cup
AFC U-23 Asian Cup
AFC U-20 Asian Cup
AFC U-17 Asian Cup
Asian Games men's football tournament
Asian Youth Games boys' football tournament
AFC Futsal Asian Cup
AFC U-20 Futsal Asian Cup
Asian Indoor and Martial Arts Games men's futsal tournament
AFC Beach Soccer Asian Cup
Asian Beach Games men's beach soccer tournament

Women's
AFC Women's Asian Cup
Asian Games women's football tournament
AFC U-20 Women's Asian Cup
AFC U-17 Women's Asian Cup
AFC Women's Futsal Asian Cup
Asian Indoor and Martial Arts Games women's futsal tournament

AFC runs the AFC Asian Cup and the AFC Women's Asian Cup, and the AFC Solidarity Cup replace AFC Challenge Cup for a country that has few chances to play in the Asian Cup. The 3 tournaments are held every 4 years. AFC organises the AFC Futsal Asian Cup, AFC Women's Futsal Asian Cup, AFC Beach Soccer Asian Cup, various age-level international association football, youth futsal tournaments and the Asian qualifying tournament for the FIFA World Cup and for football at the Summer Olympics.

Clubs 
Men's
AFC Champions League
AFC Cup
AFC Futsal Club Championship
Women's
AFC Women's Club Championship

The top-ranked AFC tournament for association football clubs is the AFC Champions League which started in the 2002–03 season (an amalgamation of the Asian Club Championship and the Asian Cup Winners' Cup) and gathers the top 1–4 teams of each country (the number of teams depend on that country's ranking and can be upgraded or downgraded); this tournament only gathered teams from top country. And AFC Women's Club Championship for women's association football club competition.

A 2nd, lower-ranked tournament is the AFC Cup which was launched by AFC in 2004. A 3rd tournament, the AFC President's Cup which had started in 2005 was absorbed into the AFC Cup in 2015.

AFC runs an annual Asian futsal club tournament, the AFC Futsal Club Championship for futsal club competition.

Defunct 

National teams
AFC Challenge Cup
Afro-Asian Cup of Nations
AFC–OFC Challenge Cup
AFC U-14 Championship
AFC U-14 Girls' Regional Championship

Clubs
Asian Cup Winners' Cup
Asian Super Cup
AFC President's Cup
Afro-Asian Club Championship

Current title holders

Defunct tournaments

Titles by nation

Rankings

FIFA World Rankings

Historical leaders 
Men's

Women's

Team of the Year

Men's elo rankings 
World Football Elo Ratings for AFC members:

Club Competitions Ranking 
The AFC Club Competitions Ranking ranks its member associations by results in the AFC competitions. Rankings are calculated by AFC. Listed here are the top 30 countries.

Beach soccer national teams 
Rankings are calculated by Beach Soccer Worldwide (BSWW).

Men's futsal 
Per 16 May 2022:

a number between brackets is the rank of the previous week.
(*)= Provisional ranking (played at least 10 matches)
(**)= Inactive for more than 24 months

Women's futsal 
AFC Women's National Futsal Team Ranking by The Roon BaUpdate: March 2022

Tournament record
Legend
 – Champion
 – Runner-up
 – Third place
 – Fourth place
QF – Quarter-finals (1934–1938, 1954–1970, and 1986–present: knockout round of 8)
R2 — Round 2 (1974–1978, second group stage, top 8; 1982: second group stage, top 12; 1986–2022: knockout round of 16)
R1 — Round 1 (1930, 1950–1970 and 1986–present: group stage; 1934–1938: knockout round of 16; 1974–1982: first group stage)
 — Qualified for upcoming tournament
 — Did not qualify
 — Did not enter / withdrawn / banned / disqualified
 — Hosts

For each tournament, the flag of the host country and the number of teams in each finals tournament (in brackets) are shown.

FIFA World Cup 

*

AFC Asian Cup

FIFA Women's World Cup

Olympic Games For Women

AFC Women's Asian Cup 

Notes:

Olympic Games For Men

FIFA U-20 World Cup

FIFA U-20 Women's World Cup

FIFA U-17 World Cup

FIFA U-17 Women's World Cup

FIFA Futsal World Cup

FIFA Beach Soccer World Cup

FIFA Confederations Cup

Controversy

AFC Champions League 
In 2020 AFC Champions League, the Football Federation Islamic Republic of Iran received a letter from AFC on 17 January 2020 announcing that teams from Iran would not be allowed to host their home matches in their country due to security concerns. The 4 AFC Champions League teams from Iran announced on 18 January 2020 that they would withdraw from the tournament if the ban was not reversed. AFC announced on 23 January 2020 that any group stage matches which the Iranian teams were supposed to host on matchdays 1, 2 and 3 would be switched with the corresponding away matches to allow time to reassess the security concerns in the country.

World Cup qualifiers 
Tensions between the 2 Koreas during the 2010 World Cup qualification had led North Korea to withdraw from hosting South Korean team and refusing to display the South Korean flag and play their national anthem. As a result, North Korea's home matches were moved to Shanghai.

During the 2022 World Cup qualifiers, North Korea reluctantly agreed to host the South Korean team in Pyongyang, the first time North Korea hosted South Korea at home in a competitive match. North Korean government banned supporters from entering the stadium. The match ended a goalless draw, and as for the result of controversies, South Korea decided to pull out the bid for the 2023 FIFA Women's World Cup, and accused North Korea of political meddling in sports. AFC was accused of doing little about the case, which led to AFC to decide the final of the 2019 AFC Cup would not be hosted in North Korea.

See also
AFC Annual Awards
List of presidents of AFC
International Federation of Association Football (FIFA)
Oceania Football Confederation (OFC)
Confederation of African Football (CAF)
Confederation of North, Central America and Caribbean Association Football (CONCACAF)
Confederation of South American Football (CONMEBOL)
Union of European Football Associations (UEFA)
List of association football competitions

References

External links

Official website 

 
Articles which contain graphical timelines
 
FIFA confederations
International organisations based in Malaysia
Organisations based in Kuala Lumpur
Sports organizations established in 1954
1954 establishments in Asia
1954 establishments in the Philippines